Chervonohryhorivka is an urban-type settlement in Nikopol Raion of Dnipropetrovsk Oblast in Ukraine. The settlement is located east of Nikopol, on the right bank of the Kakhovka Reservoir. It hosts the administration of Chervonohryhorivka settlement hromada, one of the hromadas of Ukraine. Population:

Economy

Transportation
Two stations on the railway connecting Nikopol and Zaporizhia, Revun and 110 km, are located in Chervonohryhorivka. There is infrequent passenger traffic.

Chervonohryhorivka has access to Highway H23 which connects Kryvyi Rih and Zaporizhia via Nikopol.

References

Urban-type settlements in Nikopol Raion
Populated places on the Dnieper in Ukraine